External sphincter muscle of urethra can refer to:
 external sphincter muscle of male urethra
 external sphincter muscle of female urethra